A Matter of Murder is a 1949 British crime film directed by John Gilling and starring Maureen Riscoe, John Barry, Charles Clapham, Ian Fleming and John Le Mesurier. It was made as a B film, partly at the Kensington Studios, by Vandyke Productions.

Plot
Mild mannered bank clerk, Geoffrey Dent, (John Barry) is persuaded by his nagging, gold digging girlfriend, Laura, (Sonya O'Sheato), to embezzle money. When an attempt is made on Laura's life, Geoffrey runs away with the cash to avoid being blamed. With the killer and a detective hot on his heels, Geoffrey hides out in a Cheltenham boarding house, where he becomes the murderer's next intended victim.

Cast
Geoffrey Dent - 	John Barry
Julie McKelvin - 	Maureen Riscoe
Col Peabody - 	Charles Clapham
Tony - 	Ivan Craig
Det Sgt McKelvin - 	Ian Fleming
Laura Wilson - 	Sonya O'Shea
Sgt Bex - 	Peter Madren
Ginter - 	John Le Mesurier
Cullen - 	Sam Lee
Miss Budge - 	Blanche Fothergill

References

External links

1949 films
1949 crime films
British crime films
Films directed by John Gilling
Films shot at Kensington Studios
British black-and-white films
1940s English-language films
1940s British films